Andrés Molteni (born 15 March 1988) is a professional tennis player from Argentina who specialises in doubles. He reached his highest ATP doubles ranking of No. 31 on 21 March 2022 and his highest ATP singles ranking of No. 181 in May 2011. He has won 13 doubles ATP titles. He participated in the inaugural 2020 ATP Cup and the 2022 edition as part of team Argentina.

Career

2011: Maiden Challenger
He claimed his first Challenger singles title by winning the 2011 Challenger ATP de Salinas Diario Expreso in Salinas, Ecuador where he won against his compatriot Horacio Zeballos 7–5, 7–6(4).

2021-2022: New partnership, five more titles, top 35
In 2021, Molteni won his seventh and eighth ATP 250 doubles titles at the 2021 Astana Open and the 2021 Stockholm Open partnering Santiago González.

In 2022, he won two more clay titles with S. Gonzalez at the 2022 Córdoba Open and 2022 Argentina Open.

He reached a career-high of No. 31 on 21 March 2022 following the Indian Wells Masters where he lost with Diego Schwartzman in the second round to second seeded pair of Rajeev Ram and Joe Salisbury.

2023: Third Cordoba title
He won another clay title at the 2023 Córdoba Open with compatriot Máximo González. It was his third at this tournament.

ATP career finals

Doubles: 20 (13 titles, 7 runner-ups)

ATP Challenger and ITF Futures titles (71)

Singles (16)

Doubles (55)

Notes

References

External links
 
 

1988 births
Living people
Argentine male tennis players
Tennis players at the 2020 Summer Olympics
Olympic tennis players of Argentina
Tennis players from Buenos Aires
21st-century Argentine people